St. Mary the Protectress, Ukrainian Autocephalous Orthodox Church, located in Irondequoit, New York, is an Orthodox church. The church is located on 3176 St. Paul Boulevard, Irondequoit, New York, USA.

Early history

The parish was founded in 1950 by Ukrainian immigrants that settled in the
Rochester, New York area after the post World War II period.

The parish originally purchased a church building in 1954 and was located on Clinton Avenue in the inner Rochester, New York city limits.

Current location

In 1970 the parish committee decided to buy  parcel of land where the church is now located. Initially the parish built a church hall in 1975 and used the proceeds from the rental of the hall to collect funds for the construction of the church. After the then Metropolitan Mstyslav blessed the site of where the church was built in 1978, the majority of the construction was guided by the active parish priest Anatolij Sytnyk (1933–2016).

The church was consecrated October 17, 1982 by Archbishop Mark (Hundiak).

The current pastor is Ihor Krekhovetsky.

Facilities

On the church grounds is a rectory where the current pastor lives. The rectory was built in 1976 and consecrated in 1977.

The church hall is a facility which has held many of the parish events including liturgies until the church was built. It was completed in 1976 but was destroyed by fire in the 1990s and was rebuilt.

By the church there are some dedicated monuments in memory of the Holodomor of 1932–33 and the Chernobyl disaster of 1986.

Behind the church hall is a soccer field used by the Ukrainian American Sports Club.

Gallery

References

External links
 Official Parish Website

Ukrainian Orthodox Church of the USA church buildings
Churches in Monroe County, New York
Christian organizations established in 1950
20th-century Eastern Orthodox church buildings
Eastern Orthodox churches in New York (state)
Ukrainian-American culture in New York (state)
1950 establishments in New York (state)